The 1912 Open Championship was the 52nd Open Championship, held 24–25 June at Muirfield in Gullane, East Lothian, Scotland. Ted Ray led wire-to-wire and won the championship, four strokes ahead of runner-up Harry Vardon, the defending champion.

Following the problems caused by the large number of entries in 1911, qualification was re-introduced and took place on 20, 21, and 22 June. The top twenty and ties qualified on each of the three days; George Duncan led the twenty qualifiers on Thursday by seven strokes with a score of 149, and 168 was the qualifying score. There 21 qualifiers on the second day at 162 or better, led by Ted Ray on 153. There were 21 qualifiers on the third day; Tom Ball scored 144 on Saturday, six strokes ahead of the rest, and the qualifying mark was 160.

After the first two rounds on Monday, Ray led on 144, with Vardon at 147, James Braid on 148, and George Duncan in fourth at 149.

On Tuesday, Ray extended his lead to five strokes after the third round, and he was not seriously challenged in the final round in the afternoon, despite a 71 from Vardon. Despite his weight and with his nearest rivals still to complete their rounds, Ray was carried off the final green in triumph by some of his friends.

Course

Past champions in the field 

Source:

Round summaries

First round
Monday, 24 June 1912 (morning)

Source:

Second round
Monday, 24 June 1912 (afternoon)

Source:

Third round
Tuesday, 25 June 1912 (morning)

Source:

Final round
Tuesday, 25 June 1912 (afternoon)

Source:

References

External links
Muirfield 1912 (Official site)

The Open Championship
Golf tournaments in Scotland
Open Championship
Open Championship
Open Championship